András Pándy (1 June 1927 – 23 December 2013) was a Hungarian-Belgian serial killer, convicted for the murder of six family members in Brussels between 1986 and 1990.

Originally from Hungary, Pándy is believed to have killed his wife, ex-wife, two biological children, and two step-children who disappeared mysteriously, with the assistance of his daughter, Ágnes. Additionally, he had started abusive incestuous relationships with Ágnes and a third step-child who survived. In 1992, Belgian and Hungarian police began investigating Pándy, which resulted in his arrest in 1997, and conviction in 2002. Furthermore, the skeletal remains of seven more unknown women and one man were found in one of his houses. A religious teacher and clergyman, he was dubbed "Father Bluebeard" by some of the Belgian press.

Pándy had been serving a life sentence without parole when he died on 23 December 2013.

Early life and marriages 
Pándy was born on 1 June 1927, in Chop, Carpathian Ruthenia (then under Czechoslovak administration), a village just across the border from Hungary, to Hungarian parents. Pándy was a church councillor for the Reformed Church in Hungary when he met his first wife, Ilona Sőrés. Following the failed Hungarian Revolution of 1956, they fled to Belgium where Pándy became a pastor for a small Hungarian Protestant community in Brussels, and a religious teacher for the United Protestant Church. The couple had a daughter, Ágnes, the following year and two sons: Dániel (born 1961) and Zoltán (1966). Shortly after the birth of Zoltán, the couple separated when Pándy accused his wife of infidelity. Ilona moved out of the house with their sons, leaving daughter Ágnes behind with Pándy. Then 11 years old, Ágnes soon became the victim of an incestuous relationship with her father.

At the beginning of the 1970s after his separation from Ilona, Pándy began courting other women through dating services in Hungarian newspapers, often giving them a false name and job description while using the motto "European Honeymoon". By the end of the decade, he had begun regularly visiting Hungary again, meeting his future second wife, Edit Fintor. A married woman, Fintor had three children from two previous marriages: three daughters—eight-year-old Tünde, 15-year-old Tímea, and seven-year-old Andrea. Fintor's then-husband claimed that Pándy had seduced his wife, who eloped with him to Belgium along with her children, where they married in 1979 after Pándy's divorce from Ilona Sőrés was finalized. Shortly after their marriage they had two children: a son András Jr., and a daughter Reka.

In 1984, Pándy started a second abusive incestuous relationship with his step-daughter, the now 20-year-old Tímea, whom he had impregnated after raping her. Tímea's claims of sexual abuse were brushed off by her family members, stating that she had probably used a towel containing Pándy's semen to impregnate herself. She was sent to live in a different house with Ágnes, and in what was believed to be a fit of jealousy, Ágnes tried to bludgeon Tímea to death with an iron bar in the basement of the home, until she was startled and stopped. After being hospitalized, Tímea attempted to report her abuse but her claims were again dismissed, and she later gave birth to a son, Marc. In 1986 Tímea escaped from her family, first staying with relatives in Vancouver, British Columbia, Canada, before starting a new life in Hungary.

Disappearances
Shortly before running away to Vancouver, Tímea had told her mother that the father of her son was Pándy, and that he had been sexually abusing her. This sparked a fierce argument between Fintor and Pándy, and soon after this time Fintor and the now 14 year-old Andrea disappeared. Pándy had told the police that Fintor had left him for another man and the two had moved to Germany with her new lover, using a forged telegram as evidence. Two years later in 1988, twenty years after their separation, Pándy's ex-wife Ilona and their two sons disappeared. Pándy first claimed that they had moved to France, but then changed it to South America. By 1990, Fintor's 18-year-old daughter Tünde was still alive and living with Pándy many years after the disappearance of her mother and sister. Pándy sent Ágnes away on a vacation with his younger children, András Jr. and Reka, only for her to find upon her return that Tünde had also disappeared. She was told by Pándy that she had become "disturbed" and been sent to live with another family.

Investigation, arrest and conviction 
Police investigation of the disappearances had previously been very limited and low-effort, with Pándy managing to avoid suspicion by using false testimony and forged evidence to trick the police into believing they had simply migrated away from Belgium. In 1992, two years after the last disappearance, Ágnes attempted to report her father to the police for sexual abuse. Although initially no real action was taken, suspicion against Pándy increased and the police interest in the disappearances grew. Hungarian police became involved in the investigation due to a possible connection with Pándy to cases of many missing women in Hungary. Pándy frequently visited Hungary, owning a summer home near the River Danube, and during his trips he was known to charm local women and offer to take them with him to Brussels. This theory led the two police forces to begin a joint investigation. Later, two siblings from the town, Eva Kincs and Margit Magyar, claim to have both accepted Pándy's offer, each with the hopes of becoming his wife. According to the two women, they were locked in the Brussels home by Pándy and forced to cook and clean, telling them that they would raise suspicions if they wandered out on the streets unable to speak anything but Hungarian. After rejecting separate marriage proposals, the women demanded he send them back to Hungary, and he surprisingly did.

The United Protestant Church in Belgium, Pándy's employer, had never made an official complaint against him in his role as a teacher and Protestant pastor, however in 1988 his colleague, the Dutch minister Andries den Broer, apparently became aware of abuses at home and the lack of police interest. Andries supposedly wrote to the Belgian Ministry of Justice and Queen Fabiola because of his suspicions, but received no answers. By 1996 it was discovered that he used false testimony and fake letters.

Pándy was arrested on 16 October 1997coincidentally the same date as the "White March", a large demonstration for the victims of another Belgian serial killer Marc Dutroux, who had sexually abused and killed several girls in Charleroi a few years prior. The Dutroux case was controversial in Belgium, and brought police incompetence and corruption into the national spotlight. In addition to Dutroux's case, Pándy's case had worldwide media coverage, especially after Pándy's deadpan reaction to his surroundings.

Ágnes's confession 
In November 1997, Ágnes herself was arrested by the police, and a few days later confessed to participating with her father in most of the murders of her disappeared relatives. According to Ágnes, she was solely responsible for the murder of her mother Ilona, and took part in the murders of Dániel, Zoltán, Edit and Andrea, but was not involved in (and possibly unaware of) Tünde's death. It is believed that the killing of Tünde was the only murder Pándy had committed without Ágnes's assistance. The modus operandi presented by Ágnes was, in at least two cases, murder by a handgun, and head trauma caused by a sledgehammer. The corpses were dismembered, partly dissolved in a bath filled with Liquid-Plumr in the basement, and then the remaining parts were taken to a local abattoir in Anderlecht for disposal.

Trial and sentencing 
Pándy had denied the charges, but largely due to Ágnes's testimony and assistance, enough evidence was gathered to convict him. In court, Pándy dismissed the proceedings as a "witch trial" against him, and told the jury that the allegedly dead were still alive and he is "in contact with them through angels." When asked why the missing family members could not be traced in four years of searching, Pándy replied: "It is up to justice to prove they are dead. When I'm free again, they will come and visit me." On March 6, 2002, a Belgian court convicted Pándy for the murder of six family members, attempted murder, and rape of three daughters. Pándy was sentenced to life imprisonment without parole, and housed in Leuven Centraal prison before was moved to a prison in Bruges due to health reasons. In 2007 when he turned 80, prison authorities had considered re-housing him in a retirement home.

Ágnes Pándy, now 44 years old, received a 21-year sentence for being an accomplice in five murders and one attempted murder. Prosecutors had requested a 29-year sentence for Ágnes, but her lawyers pushed for leniency, saying Ágnes had been under the "overwhelming irresistible spell" of a father who was raping her and coerced her into collaborating in the killings of her mother and siblings. Ágnes said in her closing statement: "I had no way out. I was completely in his grip."

András Pándy died on 23 December 2013, from natural causes in the Bruges prison infirmary.

Aftermath and possible additional murders

Sint-Jans-Molenbeek residences 
Pándy owned several homes within the Sint-Jans-Molenbeek area in central Brussels, along the River Senne. This included rowhouses on Vandemaelen Street, Nijverheidskaai/Quai de l'Industrie (where the majority of the murders had occurred), and Vandenbrande Street.

During an excavation at the home on Vandemaelen Street following Pándy's arrest, the skeletal remains of seven women and one man of unknown origin were discovered within the concrete of the home's basement. In January 1998 DNA profiling of the bone fragments revealed that the deceased were not relatives of Pándy, and it remains unclear if their deaths were related to the case at all. Due to Pándy's prolific uses of Hungarian dating services, there are suspicions that they were the skeletons of Hungarian women brought to Belgium. During an investigation of the home on Vandenbrande Street, several firearms including three rifles and four handguns were found stashed in a hidden compartment built into the ceiling. The Valdemaelen Street and Nijverheidskaai/Quai de l'Industrie houses were later demolished.

Possible additional murders 
After his arrest, further investigations speculated that Pándy and Ágnes had committed several additional murders of non-relatives, before and during the killing of their family members. On November 26, 1997, a month after his arrest, the Hungarian newspaper Népszava reported that Pándy had fostered an unknown number of Romanian children—orphan refugees from the 1989 revolution that toppled communist dictator Nicolae Ceaușescu—at his home in Brussels. The children were supposedly recruited by a charity called YDNAP (Pándy spelled backwards), and Népszava reported that "nobody knows what happened to them or if they returned home" to Romania. Police also linked Ágnes to the 1993 disappearance of a 12-year-old girl whose mother was romantically involved with Pándy.

Hungarian authorities had searched interconnected basements of Pándy's former home at Dunakeszi, north of the Hungarian capital Budapest. The findings were concealed, but suggested that an "old family tragedy" had been responsible for Pándy's killing spree. In fact, they suggested that the prisoner in Belgium was not Pándy at all, but rather a sibling of the real Pándy, whose death had been officially recorded in 1956, the same year of Pándy's migration to Belgium.

See also 
 List of serial killers by country
 List of serial killers by number of victims
 Marc Dutroux

References 

1927 births
2013 deaths
20th-century Belgian criminals
20th-century Lutherans
Belgian Lutherans
Belgian murderers of children
Belgian people convicted of child sexual abuse
Belgian people convicted of murder
Belgian people of Hungarian descent
Belgian prisoners sentenced to life imprisonment
Belgian rapists
Belgian serial killers
Calvinist and Reformed clergy with criminal convictions
Filicides
Hungarian emigrants to Belgium
Identity theft incidents
Incest
Male serial killers
Members of the clergy convicted of murder
Murder convictions without a body
People convicted of murder by Belgium
People from Chop, Ukraine
Prisoners sentenced to life imprisonment by Belgium
Serial killers who died in prison custody
Uxoricides
Violence against women in Belgium